The 2014–15 Svenska Cupen was the 59th season of Svenska Cupen and the third season with the current format. The winners of the competition earned a place in the second qualifying round of the 2015–16 UEFA Europa League. If they had already qualified for European competition, in which case the qualification spot will go to fourth placed team of the 2014 Allsvenskan.

A total of 96 clubs entered the competition. IF Elfsborg are the defending champions, having beaten Helsingborgs IF 1–0 in last season's final. The final was played on 17 May 2015. The final venue will be selected through a draw between the two finalists. This is a return to a format that was used between 2007 and 2011.

IFK Göteborg won their seventh Svenska Cupen title on 17 May 2015 after defeating Örebro SK 2–1.

Teams

Qualifying rounds 

The only two associations of the Swedish District Football Associations that had a qualifying tournament were Dalarnas FF and Örebro Läns FF, with the teams from other districts being determined though district championships or by club ranking in 2013.

Round 1
64 teams from the third tier or lower of the Swedish league system competed in this round. The round started on 3 June 2014 and finished on 6 August. The number in brackets indicates what tier of Swedish football each team competed in during the 2014 season. Wollmars FF was the lowest-ranked team in this round, competing in Division 6, the eight tier of Swedish football.

Round 2
All teams from 2014 Allsvenskan and 2014 Superettan entered this round, 32 teams in total, where they were joined by the 32 winners from round 1. The 32 teams from Allsvenskan and Superettan were seeded and played against the 32 winners from round 1, the matches was played at the home venues for the unseeded teams. The 16 northernmost seeded teams were drawn against the 16 northernmost unseeded teams and the same with the southernmost teams.

The draw was made on 7 August 2014. The round was primarily played on 20–21 August 2014, but teams competing in European competition had their matches postponed. The number in brackets indicates what tier of Swedish football each team competed in during the 2014 season. Assyriska Turabdin IK, IF Lödde, Myresjö/Vetlanda FK and Sollefteå GIF were the lowest-ranked teams in this round, competing in Division 3, the fifth tier of Swedish football.

Group stage
The 32 winners from round 2 were divided into eight groups of four teams. The 16 highest ranked winners from the previous rounds were seeded to the top two positions in each groups and the 16 remaining winners were unseeded in the draw. The ranking of the 16 seeded teams was decided by league position in the 2014 season. All teams in the group played each other once, the highest ranked teams from the previous rounds and teams from tier three or lower had the right to play two home matches. The draw for the group stage was held on 19 November 2014. The group stage began on 21 February and concluded on 8 March 2015. Myresjö/Vetlanda FK was the lowest-ranked team in this round, competing in Division 3, the fifth tier of Swedish football.

All times listed below are in Central European Time (UTC+1).

Tie-breaking criteria and key
If two or more teams were equal on points on completion of the group matches, the following criteria were applied to determine the rankings
superior goal difference
higher number of goals scored
result between the teams in question
higher league position in the 2014 season

Group 1

Group 2

Group 3

Group 4

Group 5

Group 6

Group 7

Group 8

Knockout stage

Qualified teams

Bracket

Quarter-finals 
The draw for the quarter-finals and semi-finals took place on Monday 9 March 2015, and the quarter-final matches are scheduled to be played on 14 and 15 March 2015. The quarter-finals consist of the eight teams that won their respective group in the previous round and the four best group winners were seeded and drawn against the other four group winners, with the seeded teams entitled to play the match at their home venue. Only teams from the top tier, 2015 Allsvenskan, qualified for the quarter-finals and the cup winners from last season, IF Elfsborg, were drawn against Allsvenskan newcomers Hammarby IF.

Semi-finals 
The semi-finals are scheduled to be played on 21 and 22 March 2015 and will consist of the four winners from the quarter-finals. The draw was a free draw and the first drawn team in each pairing play the match at their home venue.

Final

The final was played on 17 May 2015. The draw for which team to be given home advantage was held on 23 March 2015; this was the first time since the 2011 final that the match return to one of the finalist's venue.

Notes

References

External links
 Official site 

Svenska Cupen seasons
Cupen
Cupen
Sweden